The 2011 Zamfara State gubernatorial election was the 4th gubernatorial election of Zamfara State. Held on April 26, 2011, the All Nigeria Peoples Party nominee Abdul'aziz Abubakar Yari won the election, defeating Mahmud Shinkafi of the People's Democratic Party.

Results 
A total of 17 candidates contested in the election. Abdul'aziz Abubakar Yari from the All Nigeria Peoples Party won the election, defeating Mahmud Shinkafi from the People's Democratic Party. Votes cast was 1,022,991, valid votes was 989,378, 33,613 votes was cancelled.

References 

Zamfara State gubernatorial elections
Zamfara gubernatorial
April 2011 events in Nigeria